Bridlington Town Association Football Club is an association football club based in Bridlington, East Riding of Yorkshire, England.

History

The club was founded in 1918 as Bridlington Central United after the First World War. The team joined the Driffield and District Minor League, soon joining the Driffield and District League. After several seasons of hard work, the team were promoted into the East Riding Amateur League, they won the championship five consecutive times during the 1950s. They also won the East Riding Senior Cup twice around this time.

Yorkshire League
The club changed their name to Bridlington Town F.C. in 1920 and moved into the Yorkshire League Division Two, during their first season in that league, they finished runners up and were promoted. In 1960–61 they reached the First Round proper of the FA Cup eventually losing out to Bishop Auckland who were very strong at the time.

In the mid to late 1960s, Town built up a rivalry with fellow Bridlington side Bridlington Trinity. During the 1966–67 season in the Yorkshire League, Town won the championship while Trinity finished second. The following year it would be Trinity who took the title and Town finished in third. This rivalry continued until the early 1970s when Trinity became part of the Midland League.

Northern Counties East League
In 1982, the club were one of the founder members of the Northern Counties East League after the Yorkshire and Midland Leagues were merged. They were put into Northern Counties East League Division One, here they stayed for four seasons.

By 1986–87, they were promoted to the Northern Counties East League Premier Division, even though they only finished sixth. This was because several teams in the Premier Division had resigned in the close season. This gave Town the opportunity to ignite their old rivalry with Bridlington Trinity, for the first time since the early 1970s.

During the first three seasons in the Premier Division, Town finished higher. With a third and a fourth place, while Trinity were in the bottom half. The 1989–90 season was the concluding showdown for the two clubs. Town were crowned champions, while Trinity ended the season a respectable fourth. This would prove to be the end of the rivalry as Trinity folded due to the termination of their groundshare with Bridlington Town. Unfortunately for Bridlington, they were unable to put the icing on the cake in their FA Vase final clash at Wembley with Yeading, they drew the game, but lost in the replay 1–0 at Elland Road.

Cup and League success, before folding
Ken Richardson had joined the club as President and was essential in helping the club with the necessary finance to develop their ground, in order to climb the football ladder. They added a new stand, clubhouse, turnstiles and floodlights.

Town marched on to the Northern Premier League Division One. The 1992–93 season was the most successful in the club's history, they finished as champions of the NPL Division One, and they finally took the FA Vase at Wembley, beating Tiverton Town 1–0. Alan Radford scored the only goal of the game.

The sunny spell would not last. Due to legalities, the team was forced to play their home games at Doncaster Rovers' ground; Belle Vue. The club went into turmoil. They finished 21st in the Northern Premier League Premier Division and were deducted three points. Instead of going into Northern Premier League Division One, they folded.

Return
A local pub team The Greyhound, approached the lease-holders of Bridlington Town's former stadium Queensgate, looking for it to become their base. A deal was struck under the condition that the team would change their name to Bridlington Town AFC, essentially bringing the old club back to the town.

The Greyhound club agreed and a new club crest was designed and a new motto "Pergere et Eniti", which means "Onwards and Upwards". The club returned on 10 September 1994, and were put into the league where they had originally played during their formative years; the Driffield and District League, it was literally back to square one.

Bridlington progressed steadily, gaining entry to the East Riding County League Division One, they won the league and cup double. After three seasons in the East Riding County League Premier Division, Town finished runners-up and applied for promotion back into the Northern Counties East League Division One. They were accepted and spent three seasons at this level; finishing fifth, and then fourth, before achieving promotion with a runners-up spot in 2001–02. 

Town made their mark in 2002–03, reaching the quarter-final of the FA Vase before going out to Brigg Town. And they also reached the Fourth Qualifying Round of the FA Cup, eventually losing to Conference National side Southport. Bridlington Town won the league that year, they were crowned champions with 20 points ahead of the runners-up.

Recent times

The club were back in the Northern Premier League Division One and focused all their attention on it. Bridlington Town finished eleventh but were promoted back into the Northern Premier League Premier Division after the league was re-organised. Amazingly in 10 years after they were forced to start again, the club had pulled themselves back up to the highest division they had been in. It took the original club 85 years to reach that level.

In 2007, it was announced that Bridlington Town would play in the inaugural season of the Northern Premier League Division One North.  However a disastrous campaign followed, and they finished bottom of the division, and were relegated to the Northern Counties East League Premier Division. In 2012 The Seasiders won the East Riding Senior Cup, beating Hall Road Rangers (res) 9–2 in the final at the KC Stadium. They won the cup again in 2015 beating Hull United F.C. 4–2.

Steady Progression saw the club join the East Riding County League Division One, where the League and Cup Double was achieved. Over the next three seasons in the County Premier Division the club continued to improve and made application to the Northern Counties East League. It was on the third application that Bridlington Town was accepted, having finished runner up in the league but beat the league champions in the league cup final of 1998/99, under manager John Bowman. A fifth place finish in that first season back in the NCEL was creditable, but at Xmas in 2000 the club had slumped to mid-table. Bowman was replaced by Billy Heath and he took the club to a 4th place finish.

Towns 3rd season back in the NCEL saw an 18 game unbeaten run lift Town to finish Division One Runners Up and gained promotion to the Premier Division. The 2002 – 2003 season started with a continuation of the good form and 14 straight wins in all competitions. Town also reached the 4th Qualifying round of the FA Cup, losing away at Conference side Southport, and the 1/4 final of the Vase, losing away at League rivals and eventual Vase winners Brigg Town. Another incredible run of league form saw Town lose only one of the last 26 games and the Club finished as Champions with a fantastic 20 point winning margin to gain promotion to the Unibond League for 2003–2004.

Winter postponements and the cup success saw Town playing three games each week through March and April and the heavy toll caused Town to “sacrifice” the cup success for the league title. To ensure promotion, Gary Wilkinson of Wilkinson Caravans, the main sponsor, also secured the purchase of Bridlington Town AFC Ltd from the former owners thus ensuring the future of the club. The season in the Unibond Division One saw injuries and suspensions take their toll in the second half of the season but the club finished in 11th place to complete A third successive promotion, this time to the Unibond Premier Division, that was due to the reorganisation of the league and meant the new club had returned to the status held by the former club when they folded, and had achieved this in just ten seasons.

Gary Wilkinson was unable to continue with the club any longer due to financial constraints, and Pete Smurthwaite, of PBS Construction, bought the club. and after the resignation of Billy Heath Pete also has a spell as Town Manager but brought in Paul Marshall. Things did not work out for Marshall and he was replaced by the management team of Ash Berry and Paul Stoneman with the help of Coach Grant Crookes who after a year in charge were also replaced by the temporary charge of former Grimsby Town defender Mark Lever with the help of Peter Smurthwaite Town finished bottom of the UniBond league and were relegated back to the Northern counties east league.

2008/09 season Chairman Peter Smurthwaite appoints Tim Hotte and Gary Allanson as joint Managers and the club finishes a respectable 4th position in the league and lost to UniBond Premier side North Ferriby in the East Riding senior cup final at the KC Stadium and within days the Management team had resigned from the club due to personal reasons. but within days and to the delight of the Town supporters Gary Allanson had a change of heart and was back in the hot seat appointing club Captain Phil Harrison as his assistant and the pair proved to be an instant success as the club went on to win the league by 11 points and scoring 123 league goal along the way. 

2010/11 Another good season and Town were in the race to retain their title but just fell short losing out to Farsley with Parkgate being runners up. Town fans were left shocked when Manager Gary Allanson had decided to leave the club at the end of the season and was involved in helping select his successor and that was to be Mitch Cook the former Scarborough Town and Pickering Town Manager who will take charge for the 2011/12 season,

in Cook’s first season Town finished runners up to Retford missing out on the title by one point but were successful in the East riding cup beating Hall Road reserves 9-2 in the cup final at the KC Stadium in Hull.

2012/13 and Town had another good season under Mitch Cook finishing in third place with a massive 95 points and scoring 137 league goals along the way, this was to be Cook’s last season in charge as he announced he would have to stand down due to work commitments.

2013/14 Seasiders fans were delighted to see former Manager Gary Allanson return despite a big rebuilding programme due to players leaving it wasn’t a great season with the club finishing 12th in the NCEL and losing 5-2 to North Ferriby in the senior cup final.

2014/15 Another season under Gary Allanson would see an improvement on the previous season with an 8th place finish in the league but some silverware in the East Riding Senior cup after a 4-2 win against Hull United where Craig Hogg scored a hat-trick.

2015/16 the ever improving Seasiders managed a 5th place finish in the NCEL and also got to the League cup semi final losing 1-0 to eventual winners Cleethorpes Town but the club went on to retain the East Riding Senior cup after an impressive 1-0 win over North Ferriby United.

2016/17 The Seasiders didn’t have the best of starts to the league campaign but did have their best run in the National cup competitions for a number of years reaching the FA Cup 2nd qualifier and taking Harrogate Town to a replay it was a goal from former Seasider Chib Chilaka scored a 89th minute that won the replay 3-2 for Harrogate. the club also went on to the first round of the FA Vase.

It was after a 3-1 away win at Harrogate Railway that the club was shocked by news that Gary Allanson announced he would be leaving due to personal reasons, Chairman Peter Smurthwaite acted swiftly and appointed former professional footballer and British boxing champion Curtis Woodhouse along with former Hull City Legend Ian Ashbee as his assistant. The Seasiders went on an amazing 14 match winning run that saw the club close in on the title race but we just fell short in the end with a third place finish but the club had success in the East Riding Senior cup final beating Hull City 4-2 in the final the club also made it to the League cup final losing 4-1 to Penistone Church FC at Bramall Lane.

2017/18 it wasn’t the best of seasons to what we would usually expect at Bridlington Town, due to work commitments inspirational assistant manager Ian Ashbee left the club and was replaced by former Seasiders player Mally Parker. we also suffered injuries to key players like Nicky McNamara on the opening day of the season that ruled him out for the season also Jamie Forrester and Brett Agnew.

the club also lost key players to North Ferriby United.

So Curtis was having to rebuild his squad halfway through the season.

one of the highlights from the season was the success of local lad Jake Day who scored 48 goals and finished the top scorer in the NCEL Premier division.

Town finished a disappointing ninth in the league, we also lost in the league cup semi final to AFC Mansfield and we reached the East Riding Senior cup final where we lost 2-1 to Hull City at the East Riding FA headquarters.Since the departure of Curtis Woodhouse the team had been managed by aspiring caretaker manager Brett Agnew along with assistant Anthony Bowsley and after a successful trial period they were given the post on a permanent basis. The Seasiders finished a creditable 3rd place in the league and won the East Riding Senior Cup Final against Hull City u23s 3-1. 

In the 2019–20 season, where three promotion places were available, the gaffer Brett Agnew and assistant Anthony Bowsley put a good side together and were well in the race for promotion when the season was ended due to the covid-19 outbreak meaning no teams were promoted.

The 2020–21 season was another disrupted season due to the Covid pandemic. The season ended after just nine games and the Seasiders finished with seven wins and two defeats. Due to a new league formation in the Northern Premier League, Bridlington were offered promotion to the new East division which was accepted by the club.

Both Brett Agnew and his assistant Joe Lamplough announced that they were departing at the end of the 2021/22 season and credit to them both they pulled off a great escape after a last day of the season win against Dunston FC meaning the Seasiders would still be in the Northern Premier league East division for another season. 

The search for a new Manager didnt take long as former Bridlington player and more recently coach Mike Thompson was appointed the new Manager, bringing with him experienced coach Adrian Costello as his assistant and Ron Milham as goalkeeper coach.

Current squad

Former managers

Honours
Northern Premier League First Division
Champions: 1992–93
NCEL Premier Division
Champions: 1989–90, 2002–03, 2009–10
NCEL Division One
Runners-up: 2001–02
Promoted: 1985–86
Yorkshire League
Champions: 1966–67
Yorkshire League Division Two
Champions: 1974–75
Runners-up: 1959–60
FA Vase
Winners: 1992–93
Runners-up: 1989–90
East Riding Senior Cup
Winners: 2011–12, 2014–15, 2015–16, 2016–17, 2018–19

Records
FA Cup
First Round: defeated 3–2 by Bishop Auckland in 1960–61 and defeated 2–1 by York City  in 1991–92.
FA Trophy
Second Round Replay: defeated 4–0 by Eastwood Town in 2004–05.

References

External links

 Official site
 2005-6, 2006 Archive copies of previous official sites

Football clubs in England
Northern Counties East Football League
Association football clubs established in 1918
Football clubs in the East Riding of Yorkshire
Yorkshire Football League
Northern Premier League clubs
East Riding County League
Bridlington
1918 establishments in England